Edwin Sikes   was Archdeacon of Ross, Ireland from 1926 until 1950.

He was educated at Trinity College, Dublin and ordained in 1900. After a curacy in Castlemagner he held incumbencies at Ardnageehy, Cork, Shandon and Abbeystrewry.

References

Alumni of Trinity College Dublin
Archdeacons of Ross, Ireland
20th-century Irish Anglican priests